Ralph C. Hamill (February 13, 1877 – July 5, 1961) was an American college football player and coach. He served as the head coach at Centre College in Danville, Kentucky in 1900.  Hamill later worked as a neurologist and psychiatrist. He is credited with the first description of superficial siderosis, published by him in 1908. He died on July 5, 1961, at his home in Winnetka, Illinois.

Head coaching record

References

1877 births
1961 deaths
19th-century players of American football
American football halfbacks
American neurologists
American psychiatrists
Centre Colonels football coaches
Chicago Maroons football players
People from Lombard, Illinois